Sylvester W. Johnson, né Sylvester Johnson (December 31, 1900 – February 20, 1985), was an American Major League Baseball (MLB) pitcher.

Johnson's career lasted from 1922 to 1940 and he played for the St. Louis Cardinals, Cincinnati Reds, Detroit Tigers, and Philadelphia Phillies. In an emergency situation, he was the third base umpire in a game between the Brooklyn Dodgers and the Cincinnati Reds. He was a coach for the Phillies from 1937 to 1941. An early proponent of a pension plan for players, his proposal to Commissioner Kenesaw Mountain Landis was rejected although a pension plan was approved in 1947. He was inducted into the Oregon Sports Hall of Fame in 1981.

Johnson died on February 20, 1985, aged 84, leaving his wife of 62 years, Ruth Heitsman Johnson.

References

External links

1900 births
1985 deaths
Baseball players from Portland, Oregon
Brooklyn Dodgers scouts
Cincinnati Reds players
Detroit Tigers players
Los Angeles Dodgers scouts
Major League Baseball pitchers
New York Yankees scouts
Philadelphia Phillies coaches
Philadelphia Phillies players
Portland Beavers players
St. Louis Cardinals players
Seattle Rainiers players
Syracuse Stars (minor league baseball) players
Vernon Tigers players
Burials at Portland Memorial Mausoleum